Ernest Castle Sykes (31 May 1869 – 30 November 1925) was an English first-class cricketer. Sykes was a right-handed batsman who played primarily as a wicket-keeper.

Sykes represented Hampshire in one first-class match in 1896 against the touring Australians. Dean was 0* at the close of Hampshire's first innings and their second innings scored Sykes scored 5*, leaving him with no batting average due to his not out scores.

Sykes died in Bolsover, Derbyshire on 30 November 1925. His son Eric played for Derbyshire.

External links
Ernest Sykes at Cricinfo

1869 births
1925 deaths
Cricketers from Sheffield
English cricketers
Hampshire cricketers
English cricketers of 1890 to 1918